refers to a number of related Shinto shrines in Japan dedicated to the kami Ōmononushi. It may refer to:

Miwa Shrine, the main shrine in Sakurai, Nara Prefecture (formally known as Ōmiwa Shrine)
Miwa Shrine (Gifu) in Gifu, Gifu Prefecture
Miwa Shrine (Ōgaki) in Ōgaki, Gifu Prefecture
Miwa Shrine (Ibigawa) in Ibigawa, Gifu Prefecture
Miwa Shrine (Takatsuki) in Takatsuki, Osaka Prefecture

See also
Ōmiwa Shrine (disambiguation)